The 1974 Washington Star International was a men's tennis tournament and was played on outdoor clay courts. It was categorized as an AA tournament and was part of the 1974 Grand Prix circuit. It was the sixth edition of the tournament and was held at the Washington Tennis Stadium in Washington, D.C. from July 23 through July 29, 1974. Eleventh-seeded Harold Solomon won the singles title and earned $16,000 prize money in a final that was played over two days due to rain.

Finals

Singles
 Harold Solomon defeated  Guillermo Vilas 1–6, 6–3, 6–4
 It was Solomon's first singles title of his career.

Doubles
 Tom Gorman /  Marty Riessen defeated  Patricio Cornejo /  Jaime Fillol 7–5, 6–1

References

External links
 ATP tournament profile
 ITF tournament edition details

Washington Open (tennis)
Washington Star International
Washington Star International
Washington Star International